Xiaoqiao may refer to:

 Two Qiaos, pair of sisters that lived during the late Han Dynasty, the younger of which is known as "Xiaoqiao" (小喬)
 Xiaoqiao, Hebei (小樵镇), town in Jinzhou
 Xiaoqiao, Jiangxi (孝桥镇), town in Linchuan District, Fuzhou